Yellow hat may refer to:

 Yellow Hat sect, the Gelug Buddhist school. Compare with the Red Hat sect
 Positive/Positive orientation of thinking in Edward de Bono's book Six Thinking Hats